Vendom Fiord is a natural inlet in the south-west of Ellesmere Island, Nunavut in the Arctic Archipelago. To the south, it opens into Baumann Fiord.

References

Ellesmere Island
Fjords of Qikiqtaaluk Region